Kallamvaripalem is a village located in Krishna district, Andhra Pradesh, India 521163. The village population is less than 1200.

Language

The local language of Kallamvaripalem is Telugu. Telugu, previously known as Telugu, is the most widely spoken language in South-Asia.

References

Villages in Krishna district